The 2014 Indian general election in Jammu and Kashmir were held for 6 seats in the state. The voting process was held in five phases on 10, 17, 24, 30 April and 7 May 2014.

Result

|- align=center
!style="background-color:#E9E9E9" class="unsortable"|
!style="background-color:#E9E9E9" align=center|Political Party
!style="background-color:#E9E9E9" |Seats won
!style="background-color:#E9E9E9" |Seat change
|-
| 
|align="left"|Bharatiya Janata Party||3|| 3
|-
| 
|align="left"|Jammu and Kashmir Peoples Democratic Party||3|| 3
|-
| 
|align="left"|Jammu & Kashmir National Conference||0|| 3
|-
| 
|align="left"|Indian National Congress||0||
 2
|-
| 
|align="left"|Independents||0||
 1
|-
| 
|align="left"|Vacant||0||
|-
|
|align="left"|Total||6||
|}

List of elected MPs
Keys:

Bye-elections

See also 

 Elections in Jammu and Kashmir

References

Indian general elections in Jammu and Kashmir
2010s in Jammu and Kashmir
2014 Indian general election by state or union territory